Homophobia has been widespread in men's association football, also known as soccer, throughout the world. Journalist Matt Williams stated that being a gay professional player in football is still a taboo, which journalist Simon Barnes has said will never change. In February 2013, football magazine When Saturday Comes described homosexuality as a "continuing taboo" in the sport. John Amaechi, the first NBA player to come out, has blamed football's "toxic" culture for the lack of openly gay players, while English former footballer Clarke Carlisle has called for more education to be given to players to combat homophobia. In June 2022, it was revealed that homophobia made up the majority of abuse aimed at footballers, 40% for men and 27% for women.

History

Australia
Andy Brennan came out as gay in May 2019, becoming the first openly gay male professional player in Australia.

In October 2021, Josh Cavallo came out via a video posted on his club's website and social media pages. In doing so he became the only openly gay top flight professional footballer in the world.

A number of representatives of the Australian women's national team are openly gay, including Sam Kerr, Michelle Heyman and Tameka Yallop (née Butt).

Brazil
Richarlyson was named on Brazilian television as gay by the administrative manager of a rival team. When Richarlyson undertook legal action, the complaint was thrown out by the judge, who stated "football was a virile masculine sport and not a homosexual one." Richarlyson would later come out as bisexual in 2022.

In January 2019, former Botafogo footballer Douglas Braga said that he had quit football aged 21 as it was not possible for him to be both gay and a footballer.

Bárbara, Cristiane, Debinha and Marta are the most known Brazilian football players openly lesbian.

Bulgaria
In 2006, PFC Levski Sofia president Todor Batkov called referee Mike Riley a "British homosexual", following Riley's controversial sending off of Cedric Bardon during the UEFA Cup quarterfinal game against Schalke 04.

Czech Republic
In 2019, Barbora Votíková, a Paris Saint-Germain FC and Czech Republic women's national football team player, came out as gay. In February 2023, Sparta Prague and Czech Republic national team midfielder Jakub Jankto came out as gay, the first active men's international player to do so.

Denmark
Anders Lindegaard is one of the few footballers to have spoken out against the intolerance of homosexuality in football and the absence of openly gay players from the professional game. In a 2012 blog entry the Burnley FC goalkeeper wrote:

England

Justin Fashanu, older brother of fellow footballer John Fashanu, was the first professional footballer to come out as gay, after he agreed to an exclusive with The Sun tabloid newspaper on 22 October 1990. Fashanu claimed to have had an affair with a married Conservative MP who he first met in a London gay bar. A week later, John Fashanu publicly distanced himself from his brother, describing Justin as an "outcast", while Justin's manager Brian Clough famously described him as a "bloody poof." Fashanu was interviewed for the July 1991 cover story of Gay Times, and Fashanu revealed that no club had offered him a full-time contract since the story first appeared. In the morning of 3 May 1998, he was found hanged in a deserted lock-up garage he had broken into, in Shoreditch, London, after visiting Chariots Roman Spa, a local gay sauna. In his suicide note, he stated: "I realised that I had already been presumed guilty. I do not want to give any more embarrassment to my friends and family."

The prominent gay rights activist Peter Tatchell joined a Football Association campaign against homophobia in football, but later left stating the organisation does not take the matter seriously.

The gay rights group Stonewall published a report in August 2009 which described English football as "institutionally homophobic."

Heterosexual players, such as Graeme Le Saux and Sol Campbell, have also been the victim of homophobic abuse; Le Saux by fellow player Robbie Fowler, and Campbell by opposing supporters.

The Gay Football Supporters Network was founded in 1989 to campaign for gay rights in English football, and it currently organises the GFSN National League, a league consisting of gay teams. Stonewall Football Club is currently Britain's highest ranking gay football team, are on the verge of going semi-professional.

In August 2010, Hope Powell, the coach of the England women's team, was named in 68th place on The Independent newspaper's Pink List of influential lesbian and gay people in the UK.

In December 2011, a Southampton fan was banned for three years for homophobic chanting.

In 2013, David Haigh became the first openly gay managing director of an English football club. In November 2017, Pink News credited David Haigh along with Robbie Rogers and Thomas Hitzlsperger with paving the way for LGBT players and managers in football.

In December 2013, Leeds United, became the first Stonewall Diversity Champion in English football, championing gay equality within the club and wider football. Former Leeds United player Robbie Rogers, who was one of the first male professional footballers to come out as gay, launched his 'Beyond It' anti-discrimination charity with David Haigh at the club.

German player Thomas Hitzlsperger stated in January 2014 that he thought it would be a long time before there was an openly gay player in the English Premier League. John Ruddy later stated that openly gay players would be supported in England. Later that month it was revealed that Liam Davis, a non-league player with Gainsborough Trinity, has been out for four years; he is the country's only openly gay male semi-professional player.

In February 2014, it was revealed that only 11 of the Premier League's 20 teams, and only 17 of the Football League's 72 teams, had joined the 'Football v Homophobia' campaign.

Casey Stoney, captain of the England women's team, came out in February 2014.

In April 2014, Colin Kazim-Richards was found guilty of making a homophobic gesture at Brighton fans.

In August 2014, Malky Mackay and Iain Moody were accused of sending each other racist, sexist and homophobic text messages. Moody left his job as sporting director of Crystal Palace as a result. Mackay apologised for the texts. The League Manager's Association defended Mackay, claiming that the texts were merely "banter"; the LMA had to later apologise for this as well. Mackay later denied being racist, sexist or homophobic.

In August 2017, Ryan Atkin became the first openly gay match official in English football.

In January 2019, Sol Campbell spoke out about homophobic abuse he had recently received despite being a heterosexual. He had also been the victim of similar abuse in 2014.

In February 2019, two Burnley fans were accused of using racist slurs against Brighton player Gaetan Bong and homophobic slurs against Brighton fans. Their criminal trial collapsed in October 2019.

In July 2019, an anonymous Twitter account called 'The Gay Footballer' announced that they were a professional footballer playing in the EFL Championship. After saying they intended to come out publicly, they later deleted the account.

In August 2019, there were reports of homophobic chanting by Bristol Rovers fans, aimed at Brighton fans. Bristol Rovers condemned the incident. Bristol Rovers were later fined by the FA.

On 17 November 2019, Wycombe Wanderers player Ryan Allsop was allegedly subjected to homophobic chants from opposition Tranmere Rovers fans, with one arrest being made.

Later that month the Home Office announced that there had been a 66% increase in hate crime in English football from the previous year, the majority related to racism.

In December 2019, Brighton players were subjected to homophobic abuse by Wolves fans; two people were arrested. Later that month "hundreds of West Ham fans" were accused of homophobic chanting against Chelsea.

On 1 February 2020, two West Ham United fans were arrested in London Stadium by the police for directing homophobic chants towards Brighton & Hove Albion fans during a Premier League match.

In June 2020, ex-player Thomas Beattie came out as gay.

In July 2020, a current Premier League player revealed he was gay but would/could not come out. Later that month Everton players Richarlison and Lucas Digne said that a gay teammate would be accepted.

In August 2021, Norwich City player Billy Gilmour was subjected to homophobic chants from a group of Liverpool fans; the club issued a statement which condemned this.

In November 2021, Crystal Palace player Conor Gallagher was subjected to homophobic chants from a group of Leeds United fans; Leeds United issued a statement which condemned this.

In December 2021, Walsall player Manny Monthe was banned for seven matches for making a homophobic comment during a game.

In January 2022, there was homophobic chanting from fans of Spurs in a match against Chelsea. The chant was defined as a homophobic slur by the Crown Prosecution Service. Later that month Ian Holloway said he felt English football was homophobic.

On 16 May 2022, Blackpool player Jake Daniels came out as gay, making him the only current gay male professional footballer in the UK. He said that doing so would allow him to be "free and confident", and it was described by the BBC as a "watershed moment".

In October 2022, there were homophobic chants at a Chelsea-Manchester United match, with both teams' managers condemning the same.

In January 2023, there were alleged homophobic chants by Nottingham Forest fans, aimed at Chelsea fans, by Manchester United fans against Everton manager Frank Lampard (who used to play for Chelsea), by Manchester City fans, also aimed at Chelsea, and by Liverpool fans against Chelsea, for which three people were later arrested. The FA said that they would charge the clubs whose fans had targeted Chelsea, with the chant in question having being defined as a homophobic slur by the Crown Prosecution Service in January 2022.

France
Olivier Rouyer came out after retiring as a player and coach.

A gay amateur team operates in Paris under the name Paris Foot Gay. The club's highest profile supporter from within the professional game has been former France national football team player Vikash Dhorasoo (who is heterosexual) whilst a number of leading French professional clubs have signed their charter against homophobia. The club ran into controversy in 2009 however when an  amateur side Creteil Bebel refused to play them due to the "principles" of Paris Foot Gay. Additionally, Ouissem Belgacem left Toulouse FC after 5 years of having to hide his homosexuality. In 2021, he published his autobiographic novel Adieu ma honte to denounce homophobia in association football.

The issue returned to the spotlight in 2010 when amateur FC Chooz refused to register Yoann Lemaire, who had been with the club for 14 years, due to him being gay as they claimed it might lead to "trouble" with his teammates.

In March 2019, former player Patrice Evra denied making homophobic comments against Paris Saint-Germain.

In August 2019, a Ligue 2 match between Nancy and Le Mans was halted following homophobic chants from the stands against the league. France's Secretary of State for Equality, Marlene Schiappa reacted on Twitter and congratulated the referee for interrupting the match. Later that month a game between Nice and Marseille was halted due to homophobic chanting.

In May 2022, Idrissa Gueye was not included in the PSG team sheet for what manager Mauricio Pochettino revealed to be "personal reasons", and not an injury. This brought the media spotlight on Gueye; RMC Sport reported that he had refused to play in the match due to PSG's shirts featuring the rainbow flag in support of the LGBT movement, an initiative taken by Ligue 1 for the occasion of the International Day Against Homophobia, Transphobia and Biphobia. He had also notably missed the same fixture in the previous season, with the reasoning behind his non-participation then being that he was suffering from gastroenteritis. For his controversial absence against Montpellier, Gueye received backlash and calls for sanctions from Rouge Direct, an organization against homophobia, and île-de-France politician Valérie Pécresse, among others. Senegalese president Macky Sall expressed his support for Gueye, justifying the position by stating that Gueye's "religious beliefs must be respected".

Following the controversy surrounding Idrissa Gueye, French former international referee Nicolas Potier publicly came out.

Georgia
In November 2017, while playing for Dutch club Vitesse, Georgian footballer Guram Kashia wore a rainbow armband as part of the Dutch initiative Coming Out Day. His show of support for gay rights led to protests outside the Georgian Football Federation's headquarters demanding his removal from the national team, at which eight people were arrested. He described himself as being "proud to support equal rights".

Germany

The Hamburger SV (HSV) player Heinz Bonn (1947–1991) was the first Bundesliga player to be publicly known as being gay, but only after his death. He played for HSV from 1970 to 1973. He was found murdered in his flat in Hannover on 5 December 1991, apparently by a male prostitute, according to police investigators, although the crime has never been solved. The historian Werner Skrentny has said at the time Bonn was playing, journalists had little interest in the private lives of footballers and it would have been unthinkable for him to come out. HSV has its own official LGBT fan club. Blue Pride was founded in 2006. It was renamed Volksparkjunxx in 2012.

Marcus Urban, born 1971, played with the East Germany national youth football team and as an amateur in the second division club Rot-Weiß Erfurt. From the age of 13, he had been hot-housed at a specialist sports boarding school in Erfurt but at the age of 20, in 1991, when he was about to become a professional footballer, he gave up the sport. He came out to friends and family in 1994, and in 2007 publicly spoke to the media about his homosexuality and the difficulties that gay footballers experience. He said that the pressure of having to pretend to be something he was not 24 hours a day was too much for him. He became widely known after a biography titled Versteckspieler: Die Geschichte des schwulen Fußballers Marcus Urban ('Hidden Player: the story of the gay footballer Marcus Urban') was published in 2008.

Urban has since become a spokesperson and campaigner on diversity issues in sport and the workplace. He advises the German Olympic Sports Confederation and the Sports Committee of the German Federal Parliament, as well as businesses and non-profit institutions.

In December 2006, Rund magazine published an interview done over a two-year period with two gay footballers living secret lives. One was married and said his wife did not know of his sexual orientation nor realise he was involved in an intimate relationship with his childhood friend. The other often brought a female friend to social events.

In March 2010, former manager Rudi Assauer said that "If a player came to me and said he was gay I would say to him: 'You have shown courage'. But then I would tell him to find something else to do. That's because those who out themselves always end up busted by it, ridiculed by their fellow players and by people in the stands. We should spare them these witch hunts."

On 8 January 2014, Thomas Hitzlsperger, who had retired from professional football in September 2013, announced that he was gay. Before coming out, in September 2012, Hitzlsperger had publicly spoken about players coming out. In September 2014 he said that he believed the sport was tackling homophobia.

In June 2021, at the delayed UEFA Euro 2020 tournament, Germany national team captain Manuel Neuer was investigated by UEFA for wearing a rainbow captain's armband. The potential fines were dropped as the UEFA said that it was not a political statement but "a team symbol for diversity and thus for a good cause,"

Hungary
On 15 June 2021, Hungary played their opening match against Portugal at the delayed UEFA Euro 2020 tournament, with Hungarian fans allegedly displaying homophobic banners. UEFA announced an investigation.

Ireland
In June 2019, the Irish women's national football team captain Katie McCabe and fellow Irish international Ruesha Littlejohn announced that they were in a relationship. McCabe described women's football as being "very accepting" regarding gay footballers.

Mexico
Mexican football fans are known for shouting out "Puto!" (a Spanish homophobic slur), when the opposing team's goalkeeper is about to perform a goalkick. The chant has been shouted during Liga MX matches as well as in matches with the Mexico national team. However, these chants have led to fines and have also led Liga MX, FIFA, and CONCACAF to implement protocols regarding them.

The first time these protocols were initiated were during a series of matches between Club León and Monarcas Morelia in 2019.

During the 2021 CONCACAF Nations League Finals, fans chanted out the homophobic chant during both the semifinal against Costa Rica and the final match against the United States. This has led CONCACAF to initiate their anti-discrimination protocol by stopping the match in order to warn fans of getting ejected for saying the chant.

In June 2021 the Mexican Football Federation were punished by FIFA for alleged homophobic chants from their fans during the 2020 CONCACAF Men's Olympic Qualifying Championship. They were fined up to $65,000 and were forced to have the Men's National Team to play two World Cup qualifying games behind closed doors.

Netherlands
In April 2009, former Dordrecht'90 striker John de Bever married his manager and friend Kees Stevens. De Bever played at the 1996 FIFA Futsal World Championship and was named World Futsal player of the year in 1997.

In June 2021 on NOS podcast "de schaduwspits", an anonymous Eredivisie player came forward as to being homosexual. He did not reveal his identity however, because of the backlash he would receive.

Norway
Thomas Berling retired from professional football after coming out in 2000, citing widespread homophobia in the football community as the reason.

Several female players have come out as homosexual, including Bente Nordby and Linda Medalen.

In June 2015, a Bærum SK player was given a straight red card for calling his Sandnes Ulf opponent "gay" during a 1. divisjon match.

In October 2016, Stabæk Fotball became the first European club to host a pride parade preceding their home fixture against Sarpsborg 08. The team continues to host a pride parade preceding a home fixture each season.

Qatar
Ahead of the 2022 FIFA World Cup in Qatar, LGBT fans were told to be "respectful of the host nation" by British politician James Cleverly; same-sex activity is illegal in Qatar. LGBT organisations in England called on pubs and bars not to stream games.

Scotland
In May 2019, Hibernian chief executive Leeann Dempster, a lesbian, said that Scottish football was ready for its first publicly gay player.

In June 2019, Partick Thistle launched their new away kit for the 2019–20 season which featured LGBT rainbow details, becoming the first Scottish club to do so.

In June 2022, Scottish referees Craig Napier and Lloyd Wilson came out as gay.

In September 2022, Zander Murray became the first openly gay male senior player in Scotland. He later said he was "blown away" by the support he had received.

South Africa
Eudy Simelane, a player on the South Africa women's national football team, was an openly lesbian player who was raped and murdered for being gay.

Phuti Lekoloane was an openly gay male player who played in the South African third division.

Spain
The first gay and lesbian football supporters' group to be officially accepted by a Spanish club was founded in February 2009, and supports FC Barcelona.

A popular football chant in Spanish stadiums is "maricón", a slur for a gay man.

Spanish women's international Laura del Río is a lesbian.

Atlético Madrid football player Rafael Rodríguez Rapún (1912–1937) was poet Federico García Lorca's partner in life.

Referee Jesús Tomillero, the first to come out as gay, received police protection over homophobic death threats.

In October 2022, Iker Casillas tweeted that he was gay, before later deleting the tweet. He said he was hacked and apologised. Carles Puyol replied to the tweet in a joking manner, and later apologised for doing so.

Sweden
Anton Hysén, son of former Sweden international Glenn Hysén, came out as gay in March 2011 whilst playing for Utsiktens BK, then a Swedish football Division 2 side.

Turkey
Halil İbrahim Dinçdağ was a referee with the Turkey Football Federation for 13 years, but was sacked from this position due to his homosexuality. The Trabzon Board of Referees and the Turkish Football Association decided that he was not eligible for the role as he was previously excused from the military service for being homosexual. The Board of Referees has an association policy that excludes those that having not completed the military duties due to a mental illness (including homosexuality) are ineligible as referees, although normally homosexuality is not considered as such by the Turkish constitution. The Turkish Football Federation was fined 23,000 after the incident.

One of Turkey's famous football commentators, Erman Toroğlu, argued that he should not be given his referee position back due to the professional reasons such as the possibility for making wrong decisions related to his homosexuality.

In an interview with the Turkish journalist Canan Danyıldız, one of the famous Turkish football managers, Yılmaz Vural, was asked about the presence of LGBT people in Turkish football. He said that although he has never witnessed any homosexual interaction in the locker rooms, he knows that there exist gay football players in the Turkish League. He added that he does not believe homosexuality inhibits the talents of the players and that everyone should be free to live their personal lives the way that they want to. He finalized his words by saying that gay Turkish football players can never come out of the closet since everyone knows about the case of the former referee Dinçdağ.

Another important interview about LGBT people in Turkish Football was held between the journalist Elif Korap and the famous former football player and present football commentator Rıdvan Dilmen. When he was asked whether or not he knew of any gay Turkish football players, his answer was straightforward: "Of course, as there are in any other profession." Dilmen criticized other people in the Turkish football industry for not admitting the presence of LGBT people, since they are afraid of being considered as homosexual as well. Although Dilmen said that he does not approve the discrimination against the LGBT people in the Turkish football, on contrary, he argued that he would still disinherit his own kid for being gay once he was reminded about a negative comment he made during an interview in 1989.

In 2021, was reported that Galatasaray S.K. midfielder Taylan Antalyalı received homophobic abuse on Twitter for wearing a pride-themed T-shirt.

United States and Canada
Former MLS player David Testo, having been released by Montreal Impact the previous month, affirmed he was gay in an interview on the French Canadian division of Radio Canada that was published on 10 November 2011.

On 15 February 2013, midfielder Robbie Rogers, who had been released by Leeds United a few weeks earlier, came out after announcing his retirement from professional football. Rogers later stated that being openly gay was "impossible" in the sport. He has since returned to football, signing a "multi-year" contract with the Los Angeles Galaxy. Rogers stated in December 2013 that he had not received any contact from other, secretly, gay players.

In October 2020, San Diego Loyal FC player Collin Martin, who is openly gay, accused a Phoenix Rising FC opposition player of homophobic abuse in a match. San Diego Loyal walked off in protest, forfeiting the game. A few days later Phoenix Rising player Junior Flemmings received a six-match ban for the incident, and was placed by Phoenix Rising officials on administrative leave for the remainder of his contract term, which concludes on 30 November 2020. Flemmings has denied making the alleged comments.

Several female players have come out as LGBT as well. Megan Rapinoe, Abby Wambach, and Ali Krieger are notable examples.

List of LGBT footballers

Male

Female

See also

Gay Football Supporters Network
Homosexuality and bisexuality in American football
Homosexuality in modern sports
International Gay and Lesbian Football Association
List of IGLFA member clubs
List of lesbian, gay, bisexual, and transgender sportspeople
Mario (2018 film)

References

Further reading
 Beasley, Neil (2016) Football's Coming Out: Life as a Gay Fan and Player [London]: Floodlit Dreams 
 Magrath, Rory (2016) Inclusive Masculinities in Contemporary Football: Men in the Beautiful Game, Abingdon: Routledge 
 Rogers, Robbie; Marcus, Eric (2014) Coming Out to Play, London: The Robson Press

In German
 Blaschke, Ronny (2008) Versteckspieler: Die Geschichte des schwulen Fußballers Marcus Urban, Göttingen: Verlag Die Werkstatt 
 Endemann, Martin (ed.), et al. (2015) Zurück am Tatort Stadion: Diskriminierung und Antidiskriminierung in Fußball-Fankulturen, Göttingen: Verlag Die Werkstatt 
 Kosmann, Marianne (ed.) (2011) Fußball und der die das Andere: Ergebnisse aus einem Lehrforschungsprojekt, Freiburg: Centaurus Verlag & Media UG  
 Leibfried, Dirk; Erb, Andreas (2011) Das Schweigen der Männer: Homosexualität im deutschen Fußball, Göttingen: Verlag Die Werkstatt 
 Rohlwing, Christoph (2015) Homosexualität im deutschen Profifußball: Schwulenfreie Zone Fußballplatz?, Baden-Baden: Tectum-Verlag  
 Walther-Ahrens, Tanja (2011) Seitenwechsel: Coming-Out im Fußball, Gütersloh: Gütersloher Verlagshaus 

Association football culture
Association football issues
History of association football
Association Football
 
Association football player non-biographical articles